Miguel João de Andrade Hurst (born 6 June 1967), popularly as Miguel Hurst, is an Angolan actor and director of German and Portuguese descent. He is best known for the roles in the films Foreign Land, Le pacte du Silence and Filhos do Vento.

Personal life
He was born on 6 June 1967 in Freiburgo, Germany and raised until nine years. From 1977 to 1979, he lived in Guinea Bissau and then moved to Lisbon, Portugal from 1979 to 2003. During that period, he studied at the Lisbon Theater and Film School and later founded the Pau Preto Theater Group in Lisbon. In 2003, he moved to Luanda, Angola and appointed as the director of the Angolan Institute of Audiovisual and Multimedia Cinema (IACAM).

Career
In 1995 he joined the cast of Teatro Nacional D.Maria II-Lisboa. In 2007, he worked as a teacher in the discipline Introduction to Artistic Expressions at Universidade Independente, Luanda. Then from 2005 onwards, he worked on Theater History at the National Institute for Artistic Training for one year.

Between 2010 and 2016, he worke at the Goethe-Institut Angola (Instituto Cultural Alemao), where he later proposed a project to the director Christiane Schulte about documenting Angola's cinema culture. He was the artistic director at Semba Comunicação, acting in the television series Fora de Série. Later he joined with several soap operas such as Sede de Viver, O Comba, O Testamento and Minha Terra Minha Mãe. Meanwhile, in 2015, he released the book, Angola Cinemas, in collaboration with photographer Walter Fernandes.

As the founder, director and production director of the Pau Preto Theater Group, he producer several theater plays including; Os Condenados, Museu do Pau Preto, Cabral, Alimária, Idéia Karapinha, Quem, The Singing Turtle and Woza Albert.

Filmography

References

External links
 

Living people
Portuguese film directors
Angolan writers
Angolan film directors
1967 births